Pseudopyrausta cubanalis is a moth of the family Crambidae described by William Schaus in 1920.

It is native to Cuba and has a wingspan of 15 mm.

References

Moths described in 1920
Pyraustinae
Endemic fauna of Cuba